Preisler is a surname. Notable people with the surname include:

Axel Preisler (1871–1930), Danish architect
Dominik Preisler (born 1995), Czech footballer
Georg Martin Preisler (fl. 1750), German engraver
Jan Preisler, Czech artist
Johan Martin Preisler, German engraver